The 2002 Formula Renault 2000 Eurocup season was the twelfth Eurocup Formula Renault 2.0 season. The season began at Circuit de Nevers Magny-Cours on 20 April and finished at the Autódromo do Estoril on 19 October, after nine races.

Series veteran Eric Salignon scored four victories at Magny-Cours, Silverstone, Oschersleben and Imola during the season, he took the championship at the wheel of his Graff Racing-run car, giving team their first Eurocup championship. Swiss driver Neel Jani who competed with Jenzer Motorsport was the only Salignon's rival championship title was not resolved until the final round, and Jani finished in series' standings just four points behind French driver, winning races at Anderstorp, Circuit de Spa-Francorchamps and Autódromo do Estoril. Salignon's teammate Nicolas Lapierre improved to third place. Cram Competition's José María López won at Jarama on way to his fourth place. Lewis Hamilton completed the top five, competing just four of the nine races, taking his first Eurocup win in the home Donington Park race.

Teams and drivers

Calendar

Championship standings

Drivers
Points are awarded to the drivers as follows:

Teams

References

Eurocup
Eurocup Formula Renault
Renault 2000 Eurocup